Bushells is an Australian company that produces tea and coffee.

History

Bushell's was founded by Alfred Bushell in 1883, when he opened a tea shop in Queensland. His sons moved the enterprise to Sydney in 1899 and began selling tea commercially, founding Australia's first commercial tea seller. A Bushell tea factory was set up in Harrington Street Sydney and a coffee roasting department at Atherton Place in The Rocks.

Members of the Bushell family acquired the heritage-listed Sydney house, Carthona, in 1940. In the 1980s the company diversified its coffee manufacturing under the Bushells Coffee brand.

In 1998, as part of an acquisition of coffee brands from Unilever, FreshFood Services Pty Ltd purchased the Bushell's Coffee brand. The tea brand still remains with Unilever. The coffee continues to be produced at the Concord factory. FreshFood also purchased the New Zealand division of Bushells Coffee.

FreshFood, the owner and operator of the Bushell's Coffee Factory at 160 Burwood Road, Concord, has recently announced a long-term plan to close the existing factory. As of January 2018, planning is still in the early stages and the closure is at least 3-5 years away.

See also

Tea in Australia
List of oldest companies in Australia
List of tea companies

References

External links

Tea brands
Unilever brands
Tea companies of Australia
Coffee companies of Australia
Australian companies established in 1883
Food and drink companies established in 1883